The Al-Khilani Mosque is a historic Shi'ite Islamic mosque located in Baghdad, Iraq.

History 
The date of the mosque's construction is unknown, however the oldest record of the mosque is the mention by Mustafa bin Kamal al-Din al-Sadiq al-Damashq in his travel diary to Baghdad in 1726.

The tomb of Abu Jafar Muhammad ibn Uthman is located under the blue dome. The tomb itself is a hexagonal, circular zarih attached to wooden slabs.

Terrorist incident

The mosque was targeted by the terrorist attack in 2007, resulted in 78 deaths and 218 injuries.

See also
 Islam in Iraq
 List of mosques in Iraq

References

Mosques in Baghdad
Shia mosques in Iraq